Roots of Evil is an adventure for the 2nd edition of the Advanced Dungeons & Dragons fantasy role-playing game, published in 1993.

Publication history
The module was written by Eric Haddock and David Wise and published by TSR.

Contents
The module follows From the Shadows in the Ravenloft series.

Reception
Gene Alloway reviewed Roots of Evil in a 1993 issue of White Wolf. He stated that Roots of Evil "is another excellent addition to the Ravenloft sage". He concluded that: Major evil characters are dealt with, and the well-being of the Prime Material plane is at stake. All elements of this work are professionally done and a joy to play. There are plenty of ideas in here for any AD&D game or for any fantasy role playing game, for that matter. If you don't have this adventure, or the earlier From the Shadows, get them. They will show you how a good adventure is done. Overall, Alloway rated the module a 4 out of a possible 5.

References

Ravenloft adventures
Role-playing game supplements introduced in 1993